Aleksander Seiman (or Seimann; 23 January 1886 Tõstamaa Parish, Pärnu County – 5 April 1941 Tallinn (or near Tallinn)) was an Estonian military personnel.

1904-1907 he studied at Vilnius Military School.

From 17 December 1924 to 10 February 1925 he was the chief of Estonian Defence League.

Awards:
 1931: Order of the Cross of the Eagle, III class.

References

1886 births
1941 deaths
Estonian military personnel